Machinists v. Wisconsin Employment Rel. Comm'n, 427 U.S. 132 (1976), is a US labor law case, concerning the scope of federal preemption against state law for labor rights.

Facts
The Wisconsin Employment Relations Commission sought to hold a union liable for an unfair labor practice, by refusing to work overtime. An employer claimed to the National Labor Relations Board that his staff had committed an unfair practice by refusing to work overtime, but this was dismissed, as there was no violation. The employer then tried to make the same claim to the Wisconsin Employment Relations Commission, which upheld the claim and made a cease-and-desist order against the union. The Wisconsin Circuit Court affirmed this and so did the Wisconsin Supreme Court affirmed. The union appealed to the US Supreme Court.

Judgment
Brennan J held that the Wisconsin Supreme Court had not been entitled to make a ruling against the union, because its jurisdiction was preempted by the National Labor Relations Act. Such matters were to be left to "be controlled by the free play of economic forces". The judgment included the following.

See also

United States labor law

References

External links
 

Legal history of Wisconsin
United States labor case law
United States Supreme Court cases
United States Supreme Court cases of the Burger Court
1976 in United States case law
International Association of Machinists and Aerospace Workers